Tirupathi is a 2006 Indian Kannada-language action film directed by Shivamani, starring Sudeep and Pooja Kanwal. The film features background score and soundtrack composed by Rajesh Ramanath and lyrics by Kaviraj, Shivamani and Krishna.

Plot 

ACP Tirupathi decide to teach a lesson to Michael alias Dhanaraj. He is supported by the Home Minister and Ashok Rao. Dhanraj revealed to Tirupathi's father and cheats his mother. he decide to take revenge on him. Thirupathi makes his supporter turns to his rival. Dhanaraj kidnaps his mother and challenges him. Tirupathi saves his mother and kills him.

Cast 
 Sudeep as Tirupathi
 Pooja Kanwal as Nandini
 Sudha Rani as District Commissioner Margaret
 Charan Raj as Michael Raj
 Rangayana Raghu as Home Minister
 Sundeep Malani
P. N. Sathya as Gangster Onte Krishna

Production 
Sudeep plays the role of police officer for the first time in his career. He earlier played a police officer for a comedy sequence in Nalla (2004). Deepu was initially considered to play the heroine. This is Pooja Kanwal's second Kannada film after 7 O' Clock (2006). This is Sudeep's second film with producer R. S. Gowda after Maharaja (2005). Seetha and Bhanupriya were considered to play Sudeep's mother.

Soundtrack 
The soundtrack was composed by Rajesh Ramanath.

Reception 
R. G. Vijayasarathy of Rediff.com opined that "But it is Sudeep's film all the way. He oozes talent in every frame and it is really his spirited performance as Tirupati that saves the film". A critic from Chitraloka wrote that "Action lovers cannot miss this film". A critic from Nowrunning stated that "Tirupati is an engaging entertainer which can be a tasty full meal for film fans of action flicks". The film had high collections initially but later dipped in collections.

References

External links 
 

2000s Kannada-language films
2000s masala films
2006 action films
2006 films
Fictional portrayals of the Karnataka Police
Films scored by Rajesh Ramnath
Indian action films